Colin Esther (born November 1, 1989) is a Seychellois footballer. He is a midfielder playing for Seychellois club La Passe and the Seychelles national football team and has represented Seychelles in the AFCON 2018.

National team statistics

International goals
Scores and results list Seychelles's goal tally first.

References

External links
 

Living people
1989 births
Seychellois footballers
Seychelles international footballers
Association football midfielders
Light Stars FC players
Cote d'Or FC players
La Passe FC players